Post Traumatic is the first EP by Mike Shinoda; vocalist, keyboardist and guitarist of American rock band Linkin Park. The EP, Shinoda's first solo release, was released on January 25, 2018, by Warner Bros. and Machine Shop.

Background
The EP was released about six months following lead singer Chester Bennington's death and contains three songs composed by Mike Shinoda as a way to cope with the loss of his friend and to express everything he'd been going through over this period. In a release note, he wrote:

All three of the songs on the EP received official music videos and were included on the Post Traumatic album.

Track listing

Personnel
 Mike Shinoda – songwriting, performance, artwork, production, mixing on "Place to Start"
 Rob Bourdon – percussion on "Place to Start"
 Manny Marroquin – mixing on tracks "Over Again" and "Watching as I Fall"
 Michelle Mancini – mastering

References

External links
 Mike Shinoda - Official site
 

2018 debut EPs
Mike Shinoda albums
Albums produced by Mike Shinoda